Abu Bakar bin Suleiman (born 4 February 1944) is a Malaysian physician, academic administrator, business executive and former civil servant. He is currently chairman of IHH Healthcare, Asia's largest private healthcare group, and president of the IMU Group, the parent company of the International Medical University in Kuala Lumpur. He served as vice-chancellor (president) of the International Medical University from 2001 to 2015.

From 1991 to 1999, Abu Bakar served as Director-General in the Malaysian Ministry of Health. He is president of a range of national medical organisations namely the Malaysian Health Informatics Association, the National Kidney Foundation and the Association of Private Hospitals of Malaysia.

Abu Bakar holds a Bachelor of a Medicine and a Bachelor of Surgery from Monash University, from which he graduated in 1968. He also formerly served as president of the Malaysian Medical Association from 1986–1988.

Honours

Honours of Malaysia
  :
  Member of the Order of the Defender of the Realm (AMN) (1983)
  Companion of the Order of the Defender of the Realm (JMN) (1990)
  Commander of the Order of Loyalty to the Crown of Malaysia (PSM) – Tan Sri (1993)
  :
  Companion of the Order of the Crown of Johor (SMJ) (1986)
  Knight Commander of the Order of the Crown of Johor (DPMJ) – Dato' (1988)

References

1944 births
Living people
People from Johor Bahru
Malaysian medical doctors
Malaysian chairpersons of corporations
Health informaticians
Academic staff of the International Medical University
Fellows of the Royal College of Surgeons of Edinburgh
Monash University alumni
Commanders of the Order of Loyalty to the Crown of Malaysia
Knights Commander of the Order of the Crown of Johor
Companions of the Order of the Defender of the Realm
Members of the Order of the Defender of the Realm
Companions of the Order of the Crown of Johor